Alberto Víctor Aldrete was governor of the North Territory of Baja California (now the state of Baja California) from 1946 to 1947.

He was born in Ensenada, Baja California.

In 1916, Alberto Víctor Aldrete founded a customs service agency in Tijuana and together with  R. J. Walters and Paul J. Lindley created the Compañía de Tranvías de Tijuana, S. A., (Tijuana Streetcar Company, Inc.) with a capital of 5,000 pesos. Aldrete also had an interest in the Agua Caliente Racetrack.

There is a street named after him (a cross street of Avenida Revolución) in Downtown Tijuana.

References

 Héctor Mejorado de la Torre, Alberto V. Aldrete. Trayectoria empresarial y sus vínculos con la elite política (1914–1948), master's thesis in History, Instituto de Investigaciones Históricas y Facultad de Humanidades y Ciencias Sociales, Autonomous University of Baja California, 2014, pp. 66–71.

Governors of Baja California
People from Ensenada, Baja California
Railway executives
Mexican transportation businesspeople
Year of birth missing
Year of death missing
20th-century Mexican politicians
Politicians from Baja California